Moses Njue was an Anglican bishop in Kenya: he was the Bishop of Embu from 1990 to 2006.

References

20th-century Anglican bishops of the Anglican Church of Kenya
21st-century Anglican bishops of the Anglican Church of Kenya
Anglican bishops of Embu